Footsteps is singer-songwriter Chris de Burgh's seventeenth album, released in 2008. This album includes two songs penned by de Burgh and cover versions of thirteen other songs that inspired and influenced him throughout his career. The cover versions include well-known songs by bands and artists like the Beatles, Bob Dylan, Toto and Pete Seeger. In 2011, de Burgh released a follow-up album, Footsteps 2.

The album was released in Germany, Switzerland, Austria, Poland, Russia and Ukraine on November 21, 2008, and in the UK in April 2009.

Track listing
"First Steps" (Chris de Burgh) – 1:09
"Turn, Turn, Turn" (Pete Seeger) – 3:29
"The Long and Winding Road" (John Lennon, Paul McCartney) – 3:34
"Africa" (David Paich, Jeff Porcaro) – 4:15
"Without You" (Peter Ham, Thomas Evans) – 3:21
"Where Have All the Flowers Gone?" (Pete Seeger) – 3:43
"Sealed with a Kiss" (Gary Geld) – 2:36
"Blackbird" (John Lennon, Paul McCartney) – 2:24
"We Can Work It Out" (John Lennon, Paul McCartney) – 2:12
"All Along the Watchtower" (Bob Dylan) – 3:18
"Corrina Corrina" (Bo Chatmon, J. Mayo Williams, Mitchell Parish) – 2:47
"Rhythm of the Rain/Crying in the Rain" (John Gummoe, Howard Greenfield) – 3:08 (UK version only)
"Polly Von" (Peter Yarrow, Paul Stookey, Mary Travers) – 3:12
"American Pie" (Don McLean) – 4:22
"The Last Thing on My Mind" (Tom Paxton) – 3:27
"The Bells of Christmas" (Chris de Burgh) – 2:52 (Special Edition only)
"You'll Never Walk Alone" (Richard Rodgers, Oscar Hammerstein II) – 2:49 (Special Edition only)
"Footsteps" (Chris de Burgh) – 3:01

Charts and certifications

Year-end charts

Personnel 

 Chris de Burgh – lead and backing vocals, guitars
 Phil Palmer – guitars
 Neil Taylor – guitars
 Hubie Davison – additional guitars (8)
 Peter Gordeno – keyboards, backing vocals
 Nigel Hopkins – keyboards (16)
 Jerry Meehan – bass guitar
 Geoff Dugmore – drums, percussion
 Chris Cameron – orchestra arrangements and conductor 
 The Royal Philharmonic Orchestra – orchestra 
 Geoffrey Richardson – string quartet (13, 16, 17)
 Jakko Jakszyk – backing vocals
 Reclaim The Kop Choir – choir (17)

Production 

 Producers – Chris Porter and Chris de Burgh
 Engineer and Mixing – Chris Porter
 Additional Engineer at British Grove Studios – Joe Kearns
 Orchestral and band recordings at British Grove Studios.
 Additional recording and mixing at Stanley House Studios.
 Art Direction – Alex Hutchinson
 Sleeve Design – Chris de Burgh, Kenny Thomson and SJ Johnson.
 Photography – David Morley
 Front Cover Photography – Russell Kord

References

Chris de Burgh albums
2008 albums
Covers albums